Flame of Hope may refer to:
 Flame of Hope (Special Olympics), symbol of the Special Olympics
 Flame of Hope (diabetes), tribute to Dr. Frederick Banting
 Eternal Flame of Hope, tribute to disabled people on Pecaut Square in Toronto.
 The Flame of Hope, failed flame, formerly at Centenary Square in Birmingham, England
 "Flame of Hope", song from the album The Pacific Age by Orchestral Manoeuvres in the Dark